Brian Arthur Lovell Rust  (19 March 1922 – 5 January 2011) was an English jazz discographer.

Career 
Rust was born in 1922 in Golders Green, then part of the Municipal Borough of Hendon in Middlesex. He collected records from the age of five, but his most significant purchase was aged 14, when he acquired a copy of "Ostrich Walk" by the Original Dixieland Jass Band. After leaving school, Rust became a bank clerk. During the Second World War, he was a conscientious objector, and worked as an auxiliary fire officer. After the war, he returned to being a bank clerk.

He worked in the BBC's record library from 1945 to 1960, and supervised broadcasting selections. He contributed to The Gramophone magazine from 1948 to 1970, and wrote freelance from 1960, including liner notes for record releases. During the early 1960s, he was living in Hatch End, Middlesex.

Rust hosted the Mardi Gras radio programme on Capital Radio from 1973 to 1984, in which he played only 78s; his friend Chris Ellis recalled that he sounded like "a cross between an Oxford don and an overgrown schoolboy, always bubbling with enthusiasm". Rust's Jazz Records 1897–1942, revised several times since its publication in 1961, is a standard jazz discography. He moved from London to Swanage, Dorset, in 1970.

Rust died on 5 January 2011 in Swanage, England, aged 88. He was survived by his wife, Mary, and their daughters, Angela and Pamela, and a son, Victor.

Discographies

General discographies 

  .

  ; ; .

  ; .
      ; .

  ; .
 
 
 
 

   ; ; .
 
 
 
 

  ; .

  .

  ; .

Artists' discographies 

  ; .

  ; .

British discographies 

   (1894–1954); ; .

  ; .

  ; .

  ; .

  ; .

Label discographies 

  .
  .
  .
  .
  ; .

Other work

References

Citations

Further reading
 Scott Yanow, [ Brian Rust] at Allmusic
 Robert Gannon, "Brian Rust". The New Grove Dictionary of Jazz. 2nd edition, ed. Barry Kernfeld.

External links
 FolkLib Index - Brian Rust Bibliography

1922 births
2011 deaths
English music critics
English musicologists
English radio presenters
Writers from London
Discographers